This is the discography of English singer Billy J. Kramer, including his releases with the Dakotas.

Albums

Studio albums

Compilation albums

EPs

Singles

Notes

References

Discographies of British artists
Pop music discographies
Rock music discographies